John Bramhall (born 20 November 1956) is an English former professional footballer who played as a defender. He made more than 500 Football League appearances for six clubs from 1976 to 1991 and was Deputy chief executive of the Professional Footballers' Association until announcing his retirement after over 30 years in April 2022. 

Bramhall joined Tranmere Rovers in July 1976 from Stockton Heath. He made 170 league appearances for Rovers before joining Fourth Division rivals, Bury, in March 1982. He was to be a regular member of the side, although he was allowed to join Chester City on loan in November 1985. He played four games for the Blues during their promotion season from Division Four and the following season joined Rochdale.

After two years spent playing regularly in the Rochdale side, Bramhall moved again to Halifax Town and finished his league career with 32 league appearances for Scunthorpe United. This took his overall Football League appearance tally to 521, scoring 42 goals in the process.

Bramhall then played non-league football for Hyde United. He is now regularly quoted in the media through his role at the PFA. John lives in the leafy 
village of Grappenhall, Cheshire, with his wife and two sons.

Career Honours

Bury

Football League Fourth Division promotion as fourth placed team: 1984–85 (42 apps, 4 goals)

Chester City
Football League Fourth Division runners–up: 1985–86 (4 apps, 0 goals)

Notes

References

1956 births
Living people
Footballers from Warrington
English Football League players
English footballers
Association football defenders
Tranmere Rovers F.C. players
Bury F.C. players
Chester City F.C. players
Rochdale A.F.C. players
Halifax Town A.F.C. players
Scunthorpe United F.C. players
Hyde United F.C. players